Instrument Landing is guitarist Preston Reed's first release on MCA Records, part of the label's short-lived Universal Master Series, featuring releases by contemporary jazz and new age solo and session artists.

Track listing
All songs written by Preston Reed.
 "Torch Song"
 "Tiny Time Pills"
 "Frequent Flyer"
 "Inside a Face"
 "Flatonia"
 "White Espadrilles"
 "Life of Riley"
 "Fifteen Year Reunion"
 "Hammerhead"
 "Instrument Landing"
 "Bye Bye Boo Boo"

Personnel
Preston Reed - 6 & 12-string acoustic guitars

Production notes
Produced by Preston Reed
Engineered by Tom Mudge
Mastered by Glenn Meadows at Masterfonics
Recorded November/December 1988 at Studio M, St. Paul, Minnesota, using the 3M Digital Mastering Systems. Transferred to Sony 1630 using the Lexicon 480L Digital Signal Processor. THERE IS NO OVERDUBBING ON THIS RECORDING!

References

1989 albums
Preston Reed albums
MCA Records albums